Samtgemeinde Herzlake is a Samtgemeinde in the district Emsland in Lower Saxony, Germany at the Hase river.

Following villages are situated in Herzlake:

(Population 2005)

References 

Herzlake